Soul Train Radio is a radio station that plays soul music & all sub-genres in the United Kingdom, broadcasting to South West England on DAB & online.

History 
Soul Train started out as regular club nights in the South West England.

Launch 
It started broadcasting on Wednesday 6 December 2017

Presenters 

Al Bendall
Arnie 
Brova Nick
Chris Gallion
Darren Thorne
Dave Forde 
Fitzroy Facey
Jamie Joyce
Jez Kelsall
Jimmy Swing
Lady C 
MAC 3
Mike Ashley
Mike Vitti
Miranda Rae 
Nick Soul Funk
Paul Conroy
Paul Mallon
Phil Baker
Ricky 2 Tuff 
Riddim Ryda
Rodney "In The Mix"
Ronnie Herel
Stoney 
Tony Griffin
Tristan B

References

External links 
 Soul Train Radio website

Radio in the United Kingdom